The Latin Grammy Award for Best Portuguese Language Contemporary Pop Album is an honor presented annually at the Latin Grammy Awards, a ceremony that recognizes excellence and creates a wider awareness of cultural diversity and contributions of Latin recording artists in the United States and internationally. According to the category description guide for the 13th Latin Grammy Awards, the award is for vocal or instrumental Portuguese Language Contemporary Pop albums containing at least 51% playing time of newly recorded material.  For Solo artists, duos or groups.

In 2003, Tribalistas by Tribalistas  became the first album to win this award and to be nominated for Album of the Year. Portuguese band Ultraleve became the first non-Brazilian act to receive a nomination in this category in 2013. From 2000 to 2015, the award category was presented as Best Brazilian Pop Contemporary Album and was changed to its current name in 2016.

Lenine holds the record of most wins in the category with three, followed by Seu Jorge, Céu and Anavitória with two wins each.

Winners and nominees

2000s

2010s

2020s

References

External links
Official site of the Latin Grammy Awards

 
Portuguese Language Contemporary Pop Album